Federico Bessone Luna (born 23 January 1984), also known as Fede Bessone, is an Argentine professional footballer who plays for IC d'Escaldes as a left back.

Career

Early career
Born in Córdoba, Bessone spent four years as a youth player at Spanish club Barcelona, alongside Lionel Messi, who he had grown up with. He later played for Espanyol B and Gimnàstic.

Swansea City
Bessone moved from Espanyol B to Welsh team Swansea City in June 2008, on a free transfer. On 20 November 2009, Bessone scored his first goal for Swansea in a 1–0 win over League rivals Derby County, helping Swansea climb to third in the Championship, the highest position they had reached in over 26 years.

Move to England
After the 2009–10 season finished Bessone was offered a new deal at Swansea but turned it down in favour of joining Leeds United; he signed a three-year contract and became their fourth signing of the summer.

On 21 January 2011, Bessone moved to Charlton Athletic on a loan deal until the end of the season, with the option of a permanent transfer. In February 2011, Bessone gave an interview to the Yorkshire Evening Post where he admitted his performances for Leeds has been "opened to close scrutiny." In May 2011, Bessone was transfer listed by Leeds United, and he was linked with a move to Charlton. After failing to find a new club, Bessone returned to training with Leeds United in June 2011, and he was later named in their squad for a friendly tour of Scotland.

Return to Swansea
On 31 August 2011, Bessone had his contract with Leeds cancelled by mutual consent, and he re-joined Swansea that same day, to provide defensive cover for the injured Alan Tate. The transfer was initially delayed while awaiting international clearance from FIFA. Bessone only made one Premier League appearance in his second spell at Swansea, appearing as a late substitute against West Bromwich Albion.

Return to England
Bessone signed with Swindon Town on 31 August 2012,

Bessone signed with Oldham Athletic on 28 March 2013 for defensive cover as left back Jonathan Grounds was one yellow card away from a two match ban towards the end of the season. Bessone was released at the end of the season without playing a single game for the club.

United States
On 9 September 2013, Bessone signed with Sporting Kansas City of Major League Soccer. Out of contract, Bessone was released in January 2014 without playing a single game for the club.

Millwall
On 18 February 2014, he signed a short-term contract with Millwall.

AE Prat
For the 2016–17 season he returned to Spain with AE Prat.

FC Andorra
In December 2018 he signed for FC Andorra. He then signed for IC d'Escaldes.

Career statistics

References

1984 births
Living people
Footballers from Córdoba, Argentina
Argentine footballers
Association football fullbacks
Segunda División players
Segunda División B players
Tercera División players
FC Barcelona C players
RCD Espanyol B footballers
Gimnàstic de Tarragona footballers
Premier League players
English Football League players
Swansea City A.F.C. players
Leeds United F.C. players
Charlton Athletic F.C. players
Swindon Town F.C. players
Oldham Athletic A.F.C. players
Sporting Kansas City players
Millwall F.C. players
Argentine expatriate footballers
Expatriate footballers in Spain
Expatriate footballers in Wales
Expatriate footballers in England
Argentine expatriate sportspeople in Spain
Argentine expatriate sportspeople in Wales
Argentine expatriate sportspeople in England
Argentine expatriate sportspeople in the United States
AE Prat players
FC Andorra players
Argentine expatriate sportspeople in Andorra
Expatriate footballers in Andorra
Inter Club d'Escaldes players